I Shall Die Here is the fourth studio album by American sludge metal band the Body. Released on April 1, 2014, through RVNG Intl. record label, the album was produced by British electronic musician the Haxan Cloak.

Critical reception

Upon its release, I Shall Die Here received positive reviews from music critics. At Metacritic, which assigns a normalized rating out of 100 to reviews from critics, the album received an average score of 80, which indicates "generally favorable reviews", based on 9 reviews. Allmusic critic Gregory Heaney wrote: "While words like "fun" or "entertaining" aren't likely to ever be used to describe I Shall Die Here, those with the fortitude to endure its savagery and stare into the abyss will definitely know what they're made of." Natalie Zina Walschots of Exclaim! described the album as "a journey to the edge of mortality, an experiment in the musical possibilities of horror; it is troubling, altering and sublime." Fact magazine's Louis Pattison stated: "I Shall Die Here is a bracing listen, certainly no easier than The Body’s conventional albums, and in its application of intense studio treatment, at times perhaps even more intense." Nevertheless, Pattison also thought that the album is "a whole lot better" than the Body’s 2013 album for Thrill Jockey, Christ, Redeemers, eventually concluding: "Here’s a record, then, that pulls off a clever sort of flourish: both communicating a horrific plunge into darkness, while showing all its participants in the best possible light."

Pitchfork critic Nick Neyland wrote: "The execution of I Shall Die Here is so full-blooded, so committed to forcing your head underwater to the point of blackout, that it's hard not to view this as a singular piece, out there on its own, in a place most people wouldn't want to go anywhere near." The Skinnys Bram E. Gieben commented: "From the plodding, scream-infested bass wash of opener "To Carry the Seeds of Death Within Me", this record speaks to your gut." Matthew Phillips of Tiny Mix Tapes wrote that the band "is seeking something more basic, using techniques that link us on a primal level to that most universal of human certainties: death itself. Together, they give us both the forest and the harpies, the tortured and the torturer." The Wire thought that the album's "meeting of stark electronic textures and rhythms with monstrous guitars evokes Godflesh's Pure."

Track listing

Personnel
The Body
 Chip King — guitars, vocals
 Lee Buford — drums, programming

Other personnel
 The Haxan Cloak — production, recording, arrangement, synthesizer, programming
 Keith Souza — drums, programming
 Seth Manchester — drums, programming
 Gus Martin — bass guitar
 Scott Reber — synthesizer, noises
 Laura Gulley — violin, viola
 Ben Eberle — vocals
 Kathryn Teague — vocals
 Rashad Becker — mastering
 Will Work For Good — design

References

External links
 
 

2014 albums
The Body (band) albums
Electronic rock albums by American artists